Cyllopoda is a genus of moths in the family Geometridae.

Species
 Cyllopoda claudicula (Dalman, 1823)
 Cyllopoda osiris (Cramer, [1777])
 Cyllopoda postica (Walker, 1854)

Description
Species of this genus have an aposematic color pattern. They are involved in an extensive mimicry complex with other moths of the tribe Cyllopodini and other Geometridae. These day-flying moths are usually very bright with black bands on a yellow or white background.

Distribution
This genus is present in the Neotropical realm, mainly in South America with a few species in Central America and Trinidad and Tobago.

References

External Links 
 Natural History Museum Lepidoptera genus database

Cyllopodini
Geometridae of South America
Moths of South America